The Regulation of Investigatory Powers Act 2000 (c.23) (RIP or RIPA) is an Act of the Parliament of the United Kingdom, regulating the powers of public bodies to carry out surveillance and investigation, and covering the interception of communications. It was introduced by the Tony Blair Labour government ostensibly  to take account of technological change such as the growth of the Internet and strong encryption.

The Regulation of Investigatory Powers (RIP) Bill was introduced in the House of Commons on 9 February 2000 and completed its Parliamentary passage on 26 July.

Following a public consultation and Parliamentary debate, Parliament approved new additions in December 2003, April 2005, July 2006 and February 2010. A draft bill was put before Parliament during 4 November 2015.

Summary

RIPA regulates the manner in which certain public bodies may conduct surveillance and access a person's electronic communications. The Act:

 enables certain public bodies to demand that an ISP provide access to a customer's communications in secret;
 enables mass surveillance of communications in transit;
 enables certain public bodies to demand ISPs fit equipment to facilitate surveillance;
 enables certain public bodies to demand that someone hand over keys to protected information;
 allows certain public bodies to monitor people's Internet activities;
 prevents the existence of interception warrants and any data collected with them from being revealed in court.

Powers

Agencies with investigative powers

Communications data
The type of communications data that can be accessed varies with the reason for its use, and cannot be adequately explained here. Refer to the legislation for more specific information.
Charity Commission
Criminal Cases Review Commission
Common Services Agency for the Scottish Health Service
a county council or district council in England, a London borough council, the Common Council of the City of London in its capacity as a local authority, the Council of the Isles of Scilly, and any county council or county borough council in Wales
Department for Transport, for the purposes of:
Marine Accident Investigation Branch
Rail Accident Investigation Branch
Air Accidents Investigation Branch
Maritime and Coastguard Agency
a district council within the meaning of the Local Government Act (Northern Ireland) 1972
Department of Agriculture and Rural Development for Northern Ireland
Department of Enterprise, Trade and Investment for Northern Ireland (for the purposes of Trading Standards)
Department of Health (for the purposes of the Medicines and Healthcare products Regulatory Agency)
Department of Trade and Industry
Environment Agency
Financial Conduct Authority
a fire and rescue authority
Fire Authority for Northern Ireland
Food Standards Agency
Gambling Commission
Gangmasters Licensing Authority
Government Communications Headquarters
Health and Safety Executive
HM Revenue and Customs
Home Office (for the purposes of the UK Border Agency)
Independent Police Complaints Commission
Information Commissioner
a Joint Board where it is a fire authority
Office of Communications
Office of Fair Trading
The Pensions Regulator
Office of the Police Ombudsman for Northern Ireland
Port of Dover Police
Port of Liverpool Police
Post Office Investigation Branch
Postal Services Commission
NHS ambulance service Trust
NHS Counter Fraud and Security Management Service
Northern Ireland Ambulance Service Health and Social Services Trust
Northern Ireland Health and Social Services Central Services Agency
Royal Navy Regulating Branch
Royal Military Police
Royal Air Force Police
Scottish Ambulance Service Board
a Scottish council where it is a fire authority
Scottish Environment Protection Agency
Secret Intelligence Service
Security Service
Serious Fraud Office
the special police forces (including the Scottish Drug Enforcement Agency)
the territorial police forces
Welsh Ambulance Services NHS Trust

Directed surveillance and covert human intelligence sources
The reasons for which the use of directed surveillance & covert human intelligence sources is permitted vary with each authority. Refer to the legislation for more specific information.
the armed forces
Charity Commission
Commission for Healthcare Audit and Inspection
a county council or district council in England, a London borough council, the Common Council of the City of London in its capacity as a local authority, the Council of the Isles of Scilly, and any county council or county borough council in Wales
Department for Environment, Food and Rural Affairs (for the purposes of the Marine Fisheries Agency)
Department of Health (for the purposes of the Medicines and Healthcare products Regulatory Agency)
Department of Trade and Industry
Department for Transport (for the purposes of transport security, Vehicle and Operator Services Agency, Driving Standards Agency and Maritime and Coastguard Agency)
Department for Work and Pensions
Environment Agency
Financial Conduct Authority
a fire authority
Food Standards Agency
Gambling Commission
Gangmasters Licensing Authority
Government Communications Headquarters
Commissioners of Revenue and Customs
Home Office (for the purposes of HM Prison Service and the UK Border Agency)
Ministry of Defence
Northern Ireland Office (for the purposes of the Northern Ireland Prison Service)
Ofcom
Office of Fair Trading
Office of the Deputy Prime Minister
Office of the Police Ombudsman for Northern Ireland
Postal Services Commission
Port of Dover Police
Port of Liverpool Police
Royal Mail
Secret Intelligence Service
Security Service
Serious Fraud Office
Welsh Government (for the purposes of the NHS Directorate, NHS Finance Division, Common Agricultural Policy Management Division and Care Standards Inspectorate for Wales)
a territorial police force or special police force

Directed surveillance
The reasons for which the use of directed surveillance is permitted vary with each authority. Refer to the legislation for more specific information.
Health & Safety Executive
Information Commissioner
His Majesty's Chief Inspector of Schools in England (for the purposes of the Complaints, Investigation and Enforcement Team)
General Pharmaceutical Council

Controversy

Critics claim that the spectres of terrorism, internet crime and paedophilia were used to push the act through and that there was little substantive debate in the House of Commons. The act has numerous critics, many of whom regard the RIPA regulations as excessive and a threat to civil liberties in the UK. Campaign group Big Brother Watch published a report in 2010 investigating the improper use of RIPA by local councils. Critics such as Keith Vaz, the chairman of the House of Commons home affairs committee, have expressed concern that the act is being abused for "petty and vindictive" cases. Similarly, Brian Binley, Member of Parliament (MP) for Northampton South has urged councils to stop using the law, accusing them of acting like comic strip detective Dick Tracy.

The Trading Standards Institute has been very critical of these views, stating that the use of surveillance is critical to their success (see TSI press release ).

The "deniable encryption" features in free software such as FreeOTFE, TrueCrypt and BestCrypt could be said to make the task of investigations featuring RIPA much more difficult.

Another concern is that the Act requires sufficiently large UK Internet Service Providers to install technical systems to assist law enforcement agencies with interception activity. Although this equipment must be installed at the ISPs' expense, RIPA does provide that Parliament will examine appropriate funding for ISPs if the cost burden became unfairly high.

Accusations of oppressive use

In April 2008, it became known that council officials in Poole put three children and their parents under surveillance, at home and in their daily movements, to check whether they lived in a particular school catchment area. Council officials carried out directed surveillance on the family a total of 21 times. Tim Martin, the council's head of legal services, had authorised the surveillance and tried to argue that it was justified under RIPA, but in a subsequent ruling by the Investigatory Powers Tribunal – its first ever ruling – the surveillance was deemed to be unlawful. The same council put fishermen under covert surveillance to check for the illegal harvesting of cockles and clams in ways that are regulated by RIPA. David Smith, deputy commissioner at the ICO (Information Commissioner's Office) stated that he was concerned about the surveillance which took place in Poole. Other councils in the UK have conducted undercover operations regulated by RIPA against dog fouling and fly-tipping. In April 2016, 12 councils said that they use unmanned aerial vehicles for "covert operations", and that such flights are covered by the Regulation of Investigatory Powers Act 2000.

Despite claims in the press that local councils are conducting over a thousand RIPA-based covert surveillance operations every month for petty offences such as under-age smoking and breaches of planning regulations, the Office of Surveillance Commissioners' last report shows that public bodies granted 8,477 requests for Directed Surveillance, down over 1,400 on the previous year.  Less than half of those were granted by Local Authorities, and the commissioner reported that, "Generally speaking, local authorities use their powers sparingly with over half of them granting five or fewer authorisations for directed surveillance. Some sixteen per cent granted none at all."

In June 2008, the chairman of the Local Government Association, Sir Simon Milton, sent out a letter to the leaders of every council in England, urging local governments not to use the new powers granted by RIPA "for trivial matters", and suggested "reviewing these powers annually by an appropriate scrutiny committee".

Especially contentious was Part III of the Act, which requires persons to (allegedly) self-incriminate by disclosing a password to government representatives. Failure to do so is a criminal offence, with a penalty of two years in jail or five years in cases involving national security or child indecency. Using the mechanism of secondary legislation, some parts of the Act required activation by a ministerial order before attaining legal force. Such orders have been made in respect of the relevant sections of Part I and Part II of the RIP Act and Part III. The latter became active in October 2007. The first case where the powers were used was against animal rights activists in November 2007.

Identification of journalists' sources

In October 2014, it was revealed that RIPA had been used by UK police forces to obtain information about journalists' sources in at least two cases. These related to the so-called Plebgate inquiry and the prosecution of Chris Huhne for perversion of the course of justice. In both cases, journalists' telephone records were obtained using the powers of the act in order to identify their sources, bypassing the usual court proceedings needed to obtain such information.

The UK newspaper The Sun made an official written complaint to the Investigatory Powers Tribunal to seek a public review of the London Metropolitan Police's use of anti-terror laws to obtain the phone records of Tom Newton Dunn, its political editor, in relation to its inquiry into the "Plebgate" affair. The Sun’s complaint coincided with confirmation that the phone records of the news editor of the Mail on Sunday and one of its freelance journalists had also been obtained by Kent police force when they investigated Chris Huhne's speeding fraud. Journalists' sources are usually agreed to be privileged and protected from disclosure under European laws with which the UK complies. However, by using RIPA an investigating office just needs approval from a senior officer rather than the formal approval of a court hearing. Media lawyers and press freedom groups are concerned by the use of RIPA because it happens in secret and the press have no way of knowing whether their sources have been compromised. Responding to The Sun's complaint Sir Paul Kennedy, the interception of communications commissioner, launched a full inquiry and urged Home Office ministers to accelerate the introduction of promised protections for journalists, lawyers and others who handle privileged information, including confidential helplines, from such police surveillance operations. He said: "I fully understand and share the concerns raised by the protection of journalistic sources so as to enable a free press. Today I have written to all chief constables and directed them under section 58 (1) of the Regulation of Investigatory Powers Act (Ripa) to provide me with full details of all investigations that have used Ripa powers to acquire communications data to identify journalistic sources. My office will undertake a full inquiry into these matters and report our findings to the prime minister".

On 12 October 2014, the justice minister, Simon Hughes, confirmed on Sky News's Murnaghan programme that the UK government will reform RIPA to prevent the police using surveillance powers to discover journalists' sources. He said that the police's use of RIPA's powers had been "entirely inappropriate" and in future the authorisation of a judge would be needed for police forces to be given approval to access journalists' phone records in pursuit of a criminal investigation. The presumption would be that if a journalist was acting in the public interest, they would be protected, he added. Hughes further said that if the police made an application to a court he would assume a journalist would be informed that the authorities were seeking to access his phone records. More than 100,000 RIPA requests are made every year for access to communications data against targets including private citizens. It is not known how many have involved journalists' phones.

Prosecutions under RIPA
A number of offences have been prosecuted involving the abuse of investigatory powers. Widely reported cases include the Stanford/Liddell case, the Goodman/Mulcaire Royal voicemail interception, and Operation Barbatus.

Cliff Stanford, and George Nelson Liddell pleaded guilty to offences under the Regulation of Investigatory Powers Act in 2005. They were found to have intercepted emails at the company Redbus Interhouse. Stanford was sentenced to six months' imprisonment suspended for two years, and fined £20,000. It was alleged Stanford had intercepted emails between Dame Shirley Porter and John Porter (Chairman of Redbus Interhouse).
In 2007, News of the World royal editor Clive Goodman was sentenced to four months in jail for intercepting the voicemail of members of the Royal Family. His associate Glenn Mulcaire received a six-month sentence.

In 2007, Operation Barbatus exposed a sophisticated criminal surveillance business organised by corrupt police officers. A former Metropolitan Police officer, Jeremy Young, was jailed for 27 months for various offences including six counts of conspiracy to intercept communications unlawfully. A second former policeman, Scott Gelsthorpe, was sentenced to 24 months for offences including conspiracy to intercept communications unlawfully. 3 other former police officers and a private detective were also jailed for their part in running a private detective agency called Active Investigation Services.

In 2008, four people were cautioned for 'Unlawful intercepting of a postal, public or private telecommunications scheme', under S.1(1), (2) & (7). The circumstances of the offences are not known at the time of writing. Three people were tried for 'Failure to disclose key to protected information' under S.53 (of which 2 were tried).  One person was tried for 'Disclosing details of Section 49 Notice' under S.54.

In August 2009 it was announced that two people had been prosecuted and convicted for refusing to provide British authorities with their encryption keys, under Part III of the Act. The first of these was sentenced to a term of 9 months' imprisonment. In a 2010 case, Oliver Drage, a 19-year-old takeaway worker being investigated as part of a police investigation into a child exploitation network, was sentenced, at Preston Crown Court, to four months imprisonment. Mr Drage was arrested in May 2009, after investigating officers searched his home near Blackpool.  He had been required, under this act, to provide his 50-character encryption key but had not complied.

In a further case in 2010 Poole Borough Council was accused of spying unfairly on a family. Although the Council invoked powers under RIPA to establish whether a family fell into a certain school catchment area, when taken before the Investigatory Powers Tribunal it was found guilty of improper use of surveillance powers.

Amendments

In October 2020 the Government introduced the Covert Human Intelligence Sources (Criminal Conduct) Bill which would permit, in certain circumstances, to authorise security, intelligence and police agencies to participate in criminal conduct during their operations. This Bill would amend the RIPA where required.

Investigatory Powers Tribunal

The 2000 Act established the Investigatory Powers Tribunal to hear complaints about surveillance by public bodies. The Tribunal replaced the Interception of Communications Tribunal, the Security Service Tribunal, and the Intelligence Services Tribunal with effect from 2 October 2000.

Between 2000 and 2009 the tribunal upheld only 4 out of 956 complaints.

See also
 Human Rights Act 1998
 Investigatory Powers Act 2016
 Mass surveillance in the United Kingdom
 Phone hacking
 Rubber-hose cryptanalysis
 Plausible deniability
 Interception Modernisation Programme
 United States v. Boucher, a case in the US courts which determined that a criminal defendant cannot be forced to reveal his encryption passphrase but can be forced to provide a plaintext (decrypted) copy of their encrypted data, if the defendant had previously willingly shown the authorities the drive's contents (i.e., having previously incriminated himself with those contents)

References

External links
 Regulation of Investigatory Powers Information Centre (against RIP)
 Parliament "didn't understand RIP Act" 
 Articles on aspects of RIPA and Surveillance Law
 BBC News Website (April 2008) – RIPA Spy law 'used in dog fouling war'

Computing legislation
Cryptography law
History of telecommunications in the United Kingdom
Mass surveillance
United Kingdom Acts of Parliament 2000
Law enforcement in the United Kingdom
Home Office (United Kingdom)